MIPCOM (Marché International des Programmes de Communication, English: International Market of Communications Programmes) is an annual trade show held in the French town of Cannes, traditionally in the month of October and running for 4 days. It is owned and organized by Reed MIDEM, a subsidiary of Reed Exhibitions.

The event is geared towards the television industry, primarily attended by representatives of television studios and broadcasters, who use the event as a marketplace to buy and sell new programmes and formats for international distribution, as well as celebrities to promote programming. 

The event also features keynote presentations and panels featuring representatives of the industry discussing new trends and developments. Additionally, MIPCOM has been used to globally premiere highly anticipated new programs.

Prior to MIPCOM, a spin-off event known as MIPJunior is held, which is devoted exclusively to the children's television industry.

MIPCOM also has a sister event, MIPTV Media Market, which is a similar format also in Cannes by the same organizers, in the opposite half of the year (usually April). MIPCOM is slightly better attended than MIPTV.

In 2020 the event moved online due to travel restrictions related to the COVID-19 pandemic.

See also 
MIPTV, sister event

References

External links

MIPBlog
Official MIPJunior Website

Conferences in France
Cannes
Film markets
1985 establishments in France
Recurring events established in 1985